Exosternini is a tribe of clown beetles in the family Histeridae. There are at least 60 genera and 800 described species in Exosternini.

See also
For a list of genera in this tribe, see List of Histerinae genera

References

Histeridae